St. Stanislaus Kostka Parish is a Roman Catholic parish located in Woonsocket, Rhode Island. It is known for its vibrant Polish-American community, various community events, and young parishioner base. During the year, dances, bazaars, flea markets, and other events are hosted at the parish center, which is located in the church's parking lot.

Description
It was founded in 1905. It is one of the Polish-American Roman Catholic parishes in New England in the Diocese of Providence.

See also
 Catholic Church in the United States
 Catholic parish church
 Index of Catholic Church articles
 Pastoral care

Bibliography 
 
 

 The Official Catholic Directory in USA

External links 
Official site of the Holy See
St. Stanislaus Kostka - Diocesan information
 Stanislaus Kostka – Discovermass.com
 Stanislaus Kostka – Catholicmasstime.org

Churches in the Roman Catholic Diocese of Providence
Polish-American culture in Rhode Island
Polish-American Roman Catholic parishes in New England
Buildings and structures in Woonsocket, Rhode Island
Churches in Providence County, Rhode Island